Estrella María Benzo Blas, also known as Estrella, is a Spanish singer born in Seville.

Biography
Estrella was born in the Parque Alcosa district of Seville, the daughter of two musicians and singers – her mother accompanied Lola Flores in some tablaos, and her father was a singer–songwriter.

At the age of fifteen began studying piano at music school, but after two years of training decided to leave. Later she started performing vocals for other artists, and thus she came to know the Swedish producer Erik Nilsson, producer of renowned artists such as Ketama.

At the age of 21 years, Estrella debuted in mid-2006 with her single "Qué me puede quedar", in collaboration with Moroccan violinist Faiçal Kourrisc. Her first album (Estrella) was released on 7 May 2006 by Warner Music Spain and her second album (Black Flamenco) was released on 27 October 2009.

Discography

Albums
Estrella
Black Flamenco

References

Living people
1985 births
Singers from Andalusia
People from Seville
21st-century Spanish singers
21st-century Spanish women singers
Women in Latin music